Yab Yum may refer to:
 Yab-Yum, a symbol of the tantric union of male and female in Tibetan Buddhism
 Yab Yum (brothel), a famous former brothel in the Netherlands
 Yab Yum (later Edmonds Record Group), a former American record label distributed via 550 Music